The 2004 Austrian Figure Skating Championships took place in Vienna. Skaters competed in the disciplines of men's singles, ladies' singles, and ice dancing. The results were used to choose the Austrian teams to the 2004 World Championships and the 2004 European Championships.

Senior results

Men

Ladies

Ice dancing

External links
 results

Austrian Figure Skating Championships
Austrian Figure Skating Championships, 2004
Figure skating